is a small, sparsely populated island in the Sea of Japan,  northwest of Haboro Bay in Haboro, Hokkaido. The island, along with neighboring Teuri Island on its west side, belongs to the town of Haboro in Rumoi Subprefecture. It is noted for its dense forests; fully two-thirds of it remains forested.

History

Yagishiri Island, like nearby Teuri, became a base for the fishing of Pacific herring beginning in 1786. In the modern period Yagishiri Island has seen a long-term population decline: in 1947 there were 2,283 residents, by 1972 the number had fallen to 1,073, and in 2010 the population had fallen to 273.

Geography

Yagishiri is flatter than nearby Teuri, and reaches an elevation at its center of only . Yagishiri Island is primarily composed of Tertiary-period andesite formed into a four marine terraces, some with significant marine cliffs.

Climate

Yagishiritō Lighthouse

The lighthouse is a  concrete structure, painted white, and was constructed in February 1913. The Yagishiritō Lighthouse has an intensity of 7,000 candela.

Forest of Yagishiri

Yagishiri Island is noted for its dense forest. The island was once completely covered with trees, but major parts of the forest were used for housing and other construction with the start of the trade of Pacific herring in the late 18th century. A prohibition was put in place on the cutting of trees on the island in 1880 to prevent the complete deforestation of the island. Shortly afterward, in 1886, two thirds of the forest of Yagishiri was lost to a fire. The island has been significantly reforested, with the Uguisu Valley in the center of the island remaining untouched by development or fire. The forest is homes to 50 species of trees, but Yagishiri Island is noted for its unspoiled stands of Taxus cuspidata, the Japanese yew. The forest of Yagishiri is a protected natural monument of Japan, and the entirety of the island is protected as a part of Shokanbetsu-Teuri-Yagishiri Quasi-National Park.

Transportation

Yagishiri Island is connected by two ferries to the port at Haburo. The island is reached by the Ororon 2 in 60 minutes, and the Sanraina in 35 minutes. In winter is served by one trip per day by the Orororan 2, and at the peak tourist season in August the ferries each run three times per day.

References

External links
 Yagishiri Island, Haboro Tourism Organization
 The Forests of Yagishiri, Hokkaido Tourism Organization

Islands of the Sea of Japan
Islands of Hokkaido